St. Alphonsus Rodriguez School (ESAR) is a private Catholic school in Teresina, Piauí, Brazil. It was established by the Jesuits in 1963 and opened in 1965. It covers elementary through high school and includes technical courses.

The school started with 105 students. Since this was a rural area, it began as an agricultural school but with urbanization it grew into an elementary school and high school.

See also

 Catholic Church in Brazil
 Education in Brazil
 List of Jesuit educational institutions
 List of schools in Brazil

References

1963 establishments in Brazil
Agricultural schools
Buildings and structures in Piauí
Education in Piauí
Educational institutions established in 1963
Jesuit schools in Brazil
Mixed-sex education
Private schools in Brazil
Catholic primary schools in Brazil
Catholic secondary schools in Brazil
Teresina